A mimic is any living species that has evolved to resemble another successful species.

Mimic may also refer to:

To mimic, the process of observing and replicating another's behavior, also called imitation

Literary criticism and philosophy
Mimesis
Mimetic theory of Desire (Rene Girard)

Arts, entertainment, and media

Fictional characters
Mimic (comics), a character in the Marvel Comics universe
Mimic (comics)#Exiles, said character's alternate universe counterpart
Mimic (Dungeons & Dragons), a creature in the Dungeons & Dragons role-playing game
Mimic, a character in the Shantae franchise

Films
Mimic (film), a 1997 film
Mimic 2, film sequel
Mimic 3: Sentinel, film sequel
The Mimic (2017 film), a South Korean film
The Mimic (2020 film), an American comedy film

Other arts, entertainment, and media
The Mimic (TV series), a 2013-14 British TV series
Mimic, a synonym for impressionist, a performer who imitates a person for amusing or satirical effect
Mimic, a move in the Pokémon video games

Science and technology

Biology and healthcare
MIMIC (immunology) (modular immune in vitro construct), a tool used by immunologists involved in vaccine development
Mimicry, an evolved resemblance between an organism and another object
 Mimic, common name for the Asian butterfly Hypolimnas misippus

Computing
MIMIC, a simulation computer language
MIMIC Simulator, SNMP simulation software from Gambit Communications, Inc.

See also
Doppelgänger
Imitation (disambiguation)